Petherwin Gate is a hamlet in Cornwall, England. It is about half a mile south of North Petherwin.

References

Hamlets in Cornwall